This is a list of provinces of Mozambique by Human Development Index as of 2023 with data for the year 2021.

See also
List of countries by Human Development Index

References 

Mozambique
Mozambique
Human Development Index